Chandra Mohan or Chandramohan may refer to:

 Chandra Mohan (Hindi actor) (1905–1949), Hindi actor
 Chandra Mohan (Telugu actor) (born 1947), Telugu actor
 Chandra Mohan Patowary (born 1955), Indian politician from Assam
 P. Chandra Mohan, chairman
 R. G. Chandramogan, Tamil entrepreneur, founder of Hudson Agro products
 Srilamanthula Chandramohan (born 1981), Indian in artwork controversy